The 2016 Badminton Asia Team Championships were held at the GMC Balayogi Indoor Stadium in Hyderabad, India, on 15–21 February 2016 and were organised by Badminton Asia Confederation.

Host city selection
Hyderabad was selected over Bangkok in the bidding process for the first ever Badminton Asia Team Championships.

Medalists

Men's team

Group stage

Group A

China vs. Singapore

India vs. Singapore

China vs. India

Group B

Malaysia vs. Sri Lanka

Japan vs. Nepal

Japan vs. Sri Lanka

Malaysia vs. Nepal

Sri Lanka vs. Nepal

Japan vs. Malaysia

Group C

Indonesia vs. Maldives

Chinese Taipei vs. Thailand

Chinese Taipei vs. Maldives

Indonesia vs. Thailand

Indonesia vs. Chinese Taipei

Thailand vs. Maldives

Group D

South Korea vs. Philippines

Hong Kong vs. Philippines

South Korea vs. Hong Kong

Knockout stage

Quarterfinals

Semifinals

Final

Women's team

Group stage

Group A

China vs. Hong Kong

Malaysia vs. Hong Kong

China vs. Malaysia

Group B

Thailand vs. Sri Lanka

Chinese Taipei vs. Sri Lanka

Thailand vs. Chinese Taipei

Group C

South Korea vs. Maldives

Indonesia vs. Maldives

South Korea vs. Indonesia

Group D

Japan vs. Singapore

India vs. Singapore

Japan vs. India

Knockout stage

Quarterfinals

Semifinals

Final

References

External links
Happening Hyderabad Badminton Asia Team Championships 2016

2016
Asia Champ
Badminton tournaments in India
2016 in Indian sport
International sports competitions hosted by India
Sports competitions in Hyderabad, India